Beregovoye-Pervoye is a rural locality (a selo) and the administrative center of Beregovskoye Rural Settlement, Prokhorovsky District, Belgorod Oblast, Russia. The population was 318 as of 2010. There are 6 streets.

Geography 
Beregovoye-Pervoye is located 11 km northwest of Prokhorovka (the district's administrative centre) by road. Beregovoye-Vtoroye is the nearest rural locality.

References 

Rural localities in Prokhorovsky District